Hard Rock Hotel Penang was open in September 19, 2009. Being the first Hard Rock Hotel in Malaysia, Hard Rock Hotel Penang is a resort situated along the beaches of Batu Ferringhi, Penang.

References

 Hard Rock Hotel Penang to open its doors soon

External links
 

2009 establishments in Malaysia
Hotels in Penang
Hotels established in 2009
Hard Rock Cafe